A virtual learning environment  (VLE) in educational technology is a web-based platform for the digital aspects of courses of study, usually within educational institutions. They present resources, activities, and interactions within a course structure and provide for the different stages of assessment. VLEs also usually report on participation and have some level of integration with other institutional systems. In North America, VLE's are often referred to as Learning Management Systems (LMS). 

For teachers and instructors who edit them, VLEs may be used as authoring and design environments. VLEs have been adopted by almost all higher education institutions in the English-speaking world.

Components

The following are the main components required for virtual learning environments or online education curriculums. VLE learning platforms commonly allow:
Content management – creation, storage, access to and use of learning resources
Curriculum mapping and planning – lesson planning, assessment and personalisation of the learning experience
Learner engagement and administration – managed access to learner information, resources, and tracking of progress and achievement
Communication and collaboration – emails, notices, chat, wikis, blogs
Real time communication – live video conferencing or audio conferencing

A VLE may include some or all of the following elements:
 The course syllabus
 Administrative information about the course: prerequisites, credits, registration, payments, physical sessions, and contact information for the instructor.
 A notice board for current information about the ongoing course
 The basic content of some or all of the course; the complete course for distance learning applications, or some part of it, when used as a portion of a conventional course. This normally includes material such as copies of lecture in the form of text, audio, or video presentations, and the supporting visual presentations
 Additional resources, either integrated or as links to outside resources. This typically consists of supplementary reading, or innovative equivalents.
 Self-assessment quizzes or analogous devices, normally scored automatically
 Formal assessment functions, such as examinations, essay submission, or presentation of projects. This now frequently includes components to support peer assessment
 Support for communications, including e-mail, threaded discussions, chat rooms, Twitter and other media, sometimes with the instructor or an assistant acting as moderator. Additional elements include wikis, blogs, RSS and 3D virtual learning spaces.
 Links to outside sources – pathways to all other online learning spaces are linked via the VLE (Virtual Learning Environment).
 Management of access rights for instructors, their assistants, course support staff, and students
 Documentation and statistics as required for institutional administration and quality control
 Authoring tools for creating the necessary documents by the instructor, and, usually, submissions by the students
 Provision for the necessary hyperlinks to create a unified presentation to the students.
 Interactive online whiteboard for live virtual classes

A VLE is normally not designed for a specific course or subject, but is capable of supporting multiple courses over the full range of the academic program, giving a consistent interface within the institution and—to some degree—with other institutions using the system. The virtual learning environment supports the worldwide exchange of information between a user and the learning institute he or she is currently enrolled in through digital mediums like e-mail, chat rooms, web 2.0 sites or a forum.

Student accessibility features

One of the processes to enhance the learning experience was the virtual resource room, which is student-centered, works in a self-paced format, and which encourages students to take responsibility for their own learning. In virtual mode, the materials are available in the form of computer-aided learning programs, lecture notes, and special self-assessment modules. 

Another mechanism for student to student interactions is by using a cyber tutor. This allows students with an email account to connect with course content and the staff with their related questions. The students are able to contact the staff without a face to face visit which saves on-campus time. The staff remains anonymous which allows for several staff to act as a cyber tutor during the course. The student does not remain anonymous, although their email address can be cryptic enough to mask their identity. Students can discuss the exams, lab reports, posters, lectures, and obtain technical help with downloading materials. The evaluation of the use of a virtual resource room is done by surveys, focus groups, and online feedback forms. The students have the flexibility of 24 hour access to the learning material.

Similar terms
Computerized learning systems have been referred to as electronic educational technology, e-learning, learning platform or learning management system. The major difference is that VLE and LMS are applications, whereas the Learning Platform shares characteristics with an Operating System where different educational web-based applications can be run on the platform.

The terms virtual learning environment (VLE) and learning platform are generically used to describe a range of integrated web-based applications that provide teachers, learners, parents and others involved in education with information, tools, and resources to support and enhance educational delivery and management. These terms are broadly synonymous with 'managed learning environments' (MLEs) and 'managed virtual learning environments' (MVLEs).

The applications that form part of these online services can include web pages, email, message boards, and discussion forums, text and video conferencing, shared diaries, online social areas, as well as assessment, management, and tracking tools.

The term learning platform refers to a range of tools and services often described using terms such as educational extranet, VLE, LMS, ILMS and LCMS providing learning and content management. The term learning platform also includes the personal learning environment (PLE) or personal online learning space (POLS), including tools and systems that allow the development and management of portfolios.
 
The specific functionality associated with any implementation of a learning platform will vary depending upon the needs of the users and can be achieved by bringing together a range of features from different software solutions either commercially available, open source, self-built or available as free to use web services. These tools are typically delivered together via a user environment with a single entry point through integration achieved by technical standards.

Other related concepts include content management systems (CMS) which refers to the organization of the educational or other content, not the overall environment; learning content management system (LCMS), which is more often used for corporate training systems than for systems in education institutions; managed learning environment (MLE), which normally refers to the overall infrastructure in an institution of which the VLE is a component; learning support system (LSS); online learning center (OLC); or learning platform (LP), education via computer-mediated communication (CMC); or online education. The term "virtual learning environment" is more commonly used in Europe and Asia, while the synonymous term "learning management system" is the more common usage in North America.

The term LMS can also mean a "library management system" (which is now more commonly referred to as integrated library system, or ILS).

Justification

Middle Schools and High Schools use VLEs in order to:

 Increase academic performance in order to meet standards to graduate.
 Address the diverse learning needs of all students with the digital curriculum.
 Personalize learning to better meet the needs of all students including underachieving and accelerated learners.
 Equip administrators, teachers, and students with real-time progress and performance to make informed decisions to track success.

Institutions of higher and further education use VLEs in order to:

 Economize on the time of teaching staff, and the cost of instruction.
 Facilitate the presentation of online learning by instructors without web authoring experience.
 Provide instruction in a flexible manner to students with varying time and location constraints.
 Provide instruction in a manner familiar to the current web-oriented generation of students.
 Facilitate the networking of instruction between different campuses or even colleges.
 Provide for the reuse of common material among different courses.
 Provide automatic integration of the results of student learning into campus information systems.
 Provide the ability to deliver various courses to a large number of students.

In some situations, online learners performed modestly better, on average than those learning the same material through traditional face-to-face instruction.

Controversy 
VLEs are supposed to support many 21st century skills, including:
 Cultural and global awareness: Students have access to a wide network of people and information.
 Self-direction: Students are able to work at their own pace.
 Information and communication technology literacy: Students use technology to obtain and present information.
 Problem solving skills: Students are required to demonstrate their knowledge and skills in order to be assessed, and they often participate in group thinking and discussion.
 Time management: Students are required to meet deadlines.

Both supporters and critics of virtual learning environments recognize the importance of the development of such skills, including creativity, communication, and knowledge application; however, the controversy lies in whether or not virtual learning environments are practical for both teachers and students.

VLE critics pose concerns about the potential for an inter-personal disconnect that impacts both the teacher and student. The idea is proposed upon the basis that VLEs do not provide students with face-to-face interaction, which could deprive students of opportunities for better communication and deeper understanding. Educators also have concerns pertaining to a student's computer literacy skills and access to quality technology. Both can create a challenge for students to succeed in a Virtual Learning Environment. A study among Indian students has suggested that a negative experience with virtual learning environments can leave "the learner with a passive, un-engaging experience, leading to incomplete learning and low performance".

The VLE leads to a reported higher computer self-efficacy, while participants report being less satisfied with the learning process that is achieved in the Virtual Learning Environment.

Standards
Most VLEs support the Shareable Content Object Reference Model (SCORM) as a standard, but there are no commonly used standards that define how the learner's performance within a course can be transferred from one VLE to another.

There are also standards for sharing content such as those defined by the IMS Global Consortium. Local bodies such as in the school's sector in the UK, the DCSF via Becta, have additionally defined a learning platform "conformance framework" to encourage interoperability.

These systems may also be suited for the needs of independent educational programs, charter schools, and home-based education.

As virtual teaching and learning become more deeply integrated into curricula, it is important to assess the quality and rigor of virtual programs. The Virtual Learning Program Standards provide a framework for identifying key areas for effective teaching and learning in Virtual Learning Programs.

Assessments 
Educators need benchmark tools to assess a virtual learning environment as a viable means of education.

Walker developed a survey instrument known as the Distance Education Learning Environment Survey (DELES), which is accessible to students anywhere. DELES examines instructor support, student interaction, and collaboration, personal relevance, authentic learning, active learning, and student autonomy.

Harnish and Reeves provide a systematic criteria approach based on training, implementation, system usage, communication, and support.

See also

References

Further reading

External links

 
Educational technology
Content management systems
Technical communication
Learning methods
Educational software